Meton is a genus of longhorn beetles of the subfamily Lamiinae, containing the following species:

 Meton digglesi Pascoe, 1862
 Meton granulicollis Pascoe, 1859
 Meton tropicus Pascoe, 1862

References

Desmiphorini
Cerambycidae genera